Rosé railway station is a railway station in the municipality of Avry, in the Swiss canton of Fribourg. It is an intermediate stop on the standard gauge Lausanne–Bern line of Swiss Federal Railways.

Services 
 the following services stop at Rosé:

 RER Fribourg  / :
 Weekends: hourly service between Ins and Romont.

References

External links 
 
 

Railway stations in the canton of Fribourg
Swiss Federal Railways stations